Tuol Ta Aek (សង្កាត់ទួលតាឯក) is a khum (commune) of Battambang District in Battambang Province in north-western Cambodia.

Villages
Tuol Ta Aek contains five villages.

References

Communes of Battambang province
Battambang District